Mount Avers is a mountain  north of Mount Ferranto in the Fosdick Mountains, in the Ford Ranges of Marie Byrd Land. It was discovered in December 1929 by the Byrd Antarctic Expedition and named for Henry G. Avers, chief mathematician of the Division of Geodesy, U.S. Coast and Geodetic Survey, who was a member of the National Geographic Society Commission of Experts which determined that Commander (later Rear Admiral) Richard E. Byrd had reached the North Pole by airplane (1926) and the South Pole (1929).

References
 

Mountains of Marie Byrd Land